The first season of the television series Angel, the spin-off of Buffy the Vampire Slayer, premiered on October 5, 1999, on The WB and concluded its 22-episode season on May 23, 2000. The season aired on Tuesdays at 9:00 pm ET, following Buffy.

Origins 
Series co-creator David Greenwalt points out "there's no denying that Angel grew out of Buffy".  Several years before Angel debuted, Joss Whedon developed the concept behind Buffy the Vampire Slayer to invert the Hollywood formula of "the little blonde girl who goes into a dark alley and gets killed in every horror movie."  The character Angel was first seen in the first episode of Buffy and became a regular, appearing in the opening credits during seasons two and three. After being turned into a soulless, immortal vampire, he became legendary for his evil acts, until a band of wronged Gypsies punished him by restoring his soul, overwhelming him with guilt.  Angel eventually set out on a path of redemption, hoping that he could make up for his past through good deeds.  In Buffy's season three finale, he leaves Sunnydale for L.A. to continue his atonement without Buffy.  Whedon believed that "Angel was the one character who was bigger than life in the same way that Buffy was, a kind of superhero."  Whedon has compared the series to its parent, "It's a little bit more straightforward action show and a little bit more of a guys' show."

While the central concept behind Buffy was "High school as a horror movie" in small-town America, co-creators David Greenwalt and Whedon were looking to make Angel into a different "gritty, urban show."  Whedon explains "we wanted a much darker show, darker in tone.  It is set in Los Angeles because there are a lot of demons in L.A. and a wealth of stories to be told.  We also wanted to take the show a little older and have the characters deal with demons in a much different way.  Buffy is always the underdog trying to save the world, but Angel is looking for redemption.  It's those two things that creatively make the shows different."

Whedon and Greenwalt prepared a six-minute promotional video pitch, often called the "Unaired Angel pilot" for the WB Network.  Some shots from this short were later used in the opening credits.

Early during the life of the series, some effort was made to slightly soften the original concept.  For example, scenes were cut from the pilot episode, "City of," in which Angel tasted the blood of a murder victim.  The episode that was originally written to be the second episode, "Corrupt" was abandoned altogether.  Writer David Fury explains, "The network was shocked.  They said 'We can't shoot this.  This is way too dark.'  We were able to break a new idea, we had to turn it over in three days."  Instead the tone was lightened, and the opening episodes established Angel Investigations as an idealistic shoestring operation.

A first draft script reveals that Angel was originally intended to include the character Whistler, played by Max Perlich, who had already featured in the two-part Buffy season two finale. In an interview, Perlich said, "I never got called again.  If they had called, I would have probably accepted because it was a great experience and I think Joss is very original and talented."  Instead, the producers created a Whistler-like character, Doyle.  Cordelia Chase, also from the original Sunnydale crew, joined Angel and Doyle.

Season synopsis 
At the end of the third season of Buffy, the 242-year-old, re-ensouled vampire Angel left Sunnydale to give teenage Slayer Buffy Summers the chance to live a normal life. Angel is now living in the big city of Los Angeles. With Buffy gone Angel is now completely cut off from society, every day getting closer and closer to giving in to his vampiric hunger. It's not until he befriends the half demon and fellow Irishman Doyle, who is sent visions of people in trouble by The Powers That Be, and fellow Sunnydale resident Cordelia Chase, who grounds Angel's life in the humanity around him, that he truly begins to take charge of his life and seek atonement for his past sins. He sets up his own detective agency, Angel Investigations and begins to "help the helpless".

Early in the season, Angel befriends a detective named Kate Lockley who at first helps and befriends Angel but turns on him after she finds out what he truly is. As the season comes to a close, Angel gains a semi-ally in the form of a street smart vampire hunter named Charles Gunn who will officially join the team early in the next season. Throughout the year Angel and co. are frequently set upon by the demonic law firm Wolfram & Hart, and the antics of two up and coming lawyers Lindsey McDonald and Lilah Morgan, who have secret plans concerning the vampire with a soul and the role he plays in the forthcoming apocalypse.

In "I Will Remember You" Buffy comes to L.A. during which Angel is cured of his vampirism by the blood of a Mohra demon. He and Buffy then share the perfect day they always dreamed of together. However, Angel asks the Oracles to reverse time so that he can continue to help people in need realizing that he cannot protect the world as a normal human man. He subsequently gives up the one thing he ever truly loved to continue fighting the good fight.

A few days later Doyle sacrifices his life as an act of redemption when he saves the lives of a family of half demon refugees. Before he dies he gives Cordelia a long-awaited kiss as the two had slowly been building a relationship all year and passes the godly visions on to her. In his place, ex-watcher Wesley Wyndam-Pryce arrives and aids the team with his extensive knowledge of demonology and the occult.

In the two-parter, "Five by Five" and "Sanctuary", the rogue Slayer, Faith shows up in L.A. and is contracted by Wolfram & Hart to kill Angel. After torturing Wesley she ends up breaking down in Angel's arms, screaming at him to kill her. She eventually admits to the many crimes she has committed and hands herself in to the police. Seeing someone else so willingly seek redemption allows Angel to re-affirm his role and to willingly cut himself off from Buffy.  Angel also develops a friendship with Faith, sharing a powerful bond which would eventually be pivotal in their future alliances.

During the season finale Angel comes across an ancient prophecy that concerns his fate. Wolfram & Hart summon the demon Vocah to "destroy all avenues to The Powers That Be" and summon forth an ancient, terrible evil: Angel's sire, Darla. Wesley finishes translating the prophecy and learns that the word Shanshu means to both live and die informing Angel that if he truly saves the world he will be made human again and his burdens will be forever lifted. Meanwhile, the Angel Investigations offices are blown up forcing the gang to work out of Cordelia's apartment who, after having seen all the pain that infests Los Angeles, has vowed to up her stance in the fight against evil and become a better person.

Cast and characters

Main cast 
 David Boreanaz as Angel
 Charisma Carpenter as Cordelia Chase
 Glenn Quinn as Allen Francis Doyle
 Alexis Denisof as Wesley Wyndam-Pryce

Recurring cast

Guest cast 
 Seth Green as Daniel "Oz" Osbourne
 James Marsters as Spike

Crew 
Series creators Joss Whedon and David Greenwalt both served as executive producers, while Greenwalt would serve as the series' showrunner as Whedon was running Buffy. Greenwalt wrote the most episodes, writing or co-writing five episodes and contributing stories for two other episodes. Tim Minear was hired from the offset and wrote or co-wrote five episodes throughout the season and served as producer and then promoted to supervising producer midseason. He was also the first original Angel writer to write an episode; the first five scripts of the series were all written by Buffy veterans; Whedon, Greenwalt, Jane Espenson, Douglas Petrie and David Fury. Buffy writer/producer Marti Noxon served as consulting producer and did several uncredited rewrites, and co-wrote one episode with Greenwalt. The rest of writing staff included producer Tracey Stern, staff writer Jeannine Renshaw, and consulting producer Howard Gordon (who also served as consulting producer on Buffy season two). After Gordon departed to work on a new pilot, Jim Kouf joined as consulting producer. Garry Campbell was hired to write a freelance episode.

Whedon wrote and directed one episode throughout the season, the series premiere "City of", due to him working on two shows at once. He did however write the story for another two episodes; "I Fall to Pieces with David Greenwalt and "Sanctuary" with Tim Minear.

Veteran Buffy director James A. Contner (also co-producer) directed the highest number of episodes in the first season, directing four episodes. David Greenwalt directed two, including the season finale.

Episodes

Crossovers with Buffy the Vampire Slayer 
Beginning with this season, both  Angel and its parent series Buffy the Vampire Slayer aired on The WB Television Network. Both shows aired on Tuesdays, Buffy at 8:00 PM ET, and Angel at 9:00 PM ET. The first season of Angel aired along with the fourth season of Buffy. Both shows would feature crossover episodes where characters would appear on the other show. Along with the title character Angel (David Boreanaz), Cordelia Chase (Charisma Carpenter) appeared as main characters on the new series.

The first crossover appeared in the premiere episodes, where Angel calls Buffy but doesn't say anything; on Buffy, she answers the phone. After the events of the Buffy episode "The Harsh Light of Day", Oz (Seth Green) visits Los Angeles in "In the Dark" to give Angel the Gem of Amarra (a ring that makes a vampire invincible). Spike (James Marsters) also appears in both episodes.

In the "Bachelor Party", Doyle (Glenn Quinn) has a vision of Buffy in danger. This causes Angel to secretly visit Sunnydale in the Buffy episode "Pangs", to protect her. After Buffy is made aware that he was in town, Buffy (Sarah Michelle Gellar) visits L.A. in "I Will Remember You" to express her displeasure in him visiting but not telling her.

Buffy season three recurring character Wesley Wyndam-Pryce (Alexis Denisof) makes his first appearance on Angel in "Parting Gifts" and would later become a main character for the remainder of the series.

After the events of the two-part Buffy episodes "This Year's Girl" and "Who Are You?", Faith (Eliza Dushku) leaves Sunnydale and goes to L.A. in the Angel two-part episode "Five by Five" and "Sanctuary" and is hired by Wolfram & Hart to kill Angel. Buffy makes her second and final appearance on Angel in "Sanctuary".

Angel visits Sunnydale again in the Buffy episode "The Yoko Factor" to apologize to Buffy after the way he treated her in "Sanctuary." Angel has a tense confrontation with Buffy's new boyfriend, Riley Finn (Marc Blucas).

Buffy recurring character, the vampire Darla (Julie Benz), who was killed in the Buffy episode "Angel" is resurrected by Wolfram & Hart in the season one finale, "To Shanshu in L.A.".

Unproduced episode 
The original second episode was supposed to be "Corrupt", an episode written by David Fury. The episode featured the introduction of Kate Lockley, who was originally going to be an undercover cop exploring prostitution who becomes addicted to cocaine and becomes a prostitute in the process of her undercover work. The WB shut down production on the episode before filming as they believed the episode's content was too dark.

Reception 
The first season has a 95% on Rotten Tomatoes based on 21 reviews, with an average rating of 8 out 10. The site's critics consensus reads, "Angel builds on the solid sex appeal of its lead, forging an unexpectedly worthy spinoff that draws viewers in with character depth, clever humor, and a suitably dark and brooding backdrop."

On Metacritic, the season scored 75 out of 100, based on 20 reviews, indicating "Generally favorable reviews".

David Boreanaz won the Saturn Award for Best Actor on Television, while the show was nominated for Best Network Television Series and Charisma Carpenter was nominated for Best Supporting Actress on Television. The show also received its only Emmy Award nomination, for Outstanding Makeup for a Series for the episode "The Ring".

The Futon Critic named "Five by Five" the 10th best episode of 2000.

The first season averaged 4.8 million viewers.

DVD release 
Angel: The Complete First Season was released on DVD in region 1 on February 11, 2003 and in region 2 on December 10, 2001. The DVD includes all 22 episodes on 6 discs presented in full frame 1.33:1 aspect ratio. Special features on the DVD include two commentary tracks—"City of" by creators Joss Whedon and David Greenwalt and "Rm w/a Vu" by writer Jane Espenson. Scripts for "Five by Five" and "Sanctuary" are included. Featurettes include, "I'm Cordelia", a showcase of the title character with interview with actress Charisma Carpenter; "Introducing Angel", and overview of the conception of the show; "The Demons", which details the various demons featured in the season; and "Season 1 Overview", where cast and crew members discuss the season. Also included are cast biographies and photo galleries.

References

External links 
 

Angel (1999 TV series)
 
1999 American television seasons
2000 American television seasons